Pudimoe or Pudumong is a town in Dr Ruth Segomotsi Mompati District Municipality in the North West province of South Africa.

The name, derived from the Tswana language, means “place of wildebeest”. It formerly bore the adapted name Pudimoe, which is still in use at the town’s train station.

References

Sqitoe, Lere, Summer, Gee, Junior, Jay J, DiepKlerk, Peekay, KC, and Nino are gonna make an improvement on Pudimoe's economy. This small town is about to experience some real changes. 

Populated places in the Greater Taung Local Municipality